Scott Westgarth (10 July 1986 – 26 February 2018) was a British light heavyweight boxer. He died on 26 February 2018 at the age of 31 after sustaining injuries following a victory in a 10-round light heavyweight bout during a Saturday night clash. Westgarth's final fight was widely considered to be the biggest victory of his career.

Career 
Westgarth boxed 10 matches in his professional career, ending with 7 victories, 2 losses and a draw before his death. He fought in his final bout on 24 February 2018 against Dec Spelman. This was a 10-round light heavyweight eliminator in Doncaster. He defeated Spelman in the elimination match on points and was looking to try to win the English national championship.

Death 
During the final round of the fight against Spelman, Westgarth was knocked down, but was able to recover to ultimately win on points. He went on to conduct a post-match interview before consulting doctors in the dressing room. They sent him to Royal Hallamshire Hospital in an ambulance after concerns for his well-being. During the interview Westgarth held his wrapped hand to his head above his left eye a number of times, suggesting he was in some discomfort.

Westgarth died the next day, 25 February 2018. Westgarth was a registered organ donor.

See also 
List of deaths due to injuries sustained in boxing

References 

1986 births
2018 deaths
English male boxers
Light-heavyweight boxers
Deaths due to injuries sustained in boxing
Sport deaths in England
Sportspeople from Hexham
Organ transplant donors